Carmo Planetarium is a planetarium in Parque do Carmo, eastern São Paulo, Brazil. It is part of the Open University of the Environment and Culture of Peace (UMAPAZ), and opened on 30 November 2005. It is one of three planetaria in São Paulo, the others being Professor Aristóteles Orsini Planetarium and the Johannes Kepler Planetarium at Sabina Escola Parque do Conhecimento.

Description

There is also a 70-seat classroom, reading space, and a lobby with exhibitions. Two telescopes are located on a terrace behind the planetarium. The planetarium building cost R$11 million to construct, and the projector cost R$5 million to purchase.

The planetarium is located at 137 John Speers Street. Several bus routes pass near to the planetarium. It hosts pre-booked school visits on weekdays, and is open to the public on weekends and some weekdays during school holidays.

Closures
The planetarium closed in 2007 due to structural problems arising from infiltration, and fungi was discovered on the lens of the projector in 2010. The observation area reopened in 2012, before closing again in January 2013 due to a water leak. The planetarium reopened on 8 May 2016, after repairs costing R$1.2 million. It reopened with revised management, and a branch of the astrophysics school (which is primarily located at the other planetarium in São Paulo).

References

Planetaria
Buildings and structures in São Paulo
Education in São Paulo
2005 establishments in Brazil